The Lancashire Wolverines are an American football team based in Preston, Lancashire, England, who compete in the BAFA National Leagues NFC 1 Central, the second level of British American Football. They currently operate from the UCLAN Sports Arena and were formed in 1989 but were a coming together of two previous sides that had folded, the Wigan Wolverines and the Lancashire Chieftains. The Wolverines folded again in 2004 but had reformed and been re-instated by 2007. Aside from their current home, the team has previously operated from other towns within the area namely Blackburn and Wigan in Greater Manchester.

The club also operate an Academy setup which incorporates a number of other football sides, namely the BUCS University sides the Lancaster Bombers and the UCLAN Rams, and youth sides the Chorley Buccaneers and the Standish Raiders. The club are two-time regional Division champions having won their respective Division's in 2011 and 2012.

History

The Wolverines first competed in British American Football from 1989 and were present until 2004 when off-field problems caused them to pull out of the league. They were formed from the remnants of the Wigan Wolverines, and were bolstered by the merger with the Lancashire Chieftains in 1990. The Wolverines competed in the BNGL during its six-year existence, and thereafter have been in the British American Football League.
Lancashire have made the playoffs on 7 occasions, but have yet to win a Bowl. They reached the BSL Division Two final in 1998 and were promoted to Division One only to quickly return in 1999.
Division one status was regained in 2002, and the Wolverines finished that season with a 3-7-0 record. A better year in 2003, resulted in a winning record in Division One with a 5-2-1 record, this season included the only ever Wolverines away victory against the Birmingham Bulls American Football Team, the game was very close with the final score 6-0 to Lancashire. Birmingham responded by handing out a 50-8 reply in the end of season playoffs.
Despite location in a new venue in 2004 (the impressive Bolton Arena), the Wolverines pulled out of the league mid-season.

Back in the league, after a few years, the Wolverines went 9-1 in the 2011 season in division 2. They were beaten at the semi final stage of the post season, but regardless of this were granted promotion to Division 1 North in a league reshuffle.

Academy
The Lancashire Wolverines as an 18 year old+ squad are the senior team in the Lancashire Academy of Football  . The teams under the academy banner are:
 Lancashire Wolverines, adult (18+) kitted team
 Lancaster Bombers, University kitted team
 UCLan Rams, University kitted team
 Chorley Buccaneers, cadet (7-11yr olds), junior flag teams (11-14yr olds) & youth kitted team (14-16 year olds).
 Standish Raiders, junior flag teams (11-14yr olds) & youth kitted team (14-16 year olds).

Seasonal Records
2019 BAFA NL Division One North Conference 7-3-0

2018 BAFA NL Division One North Conference 7-2-1*

2017 BAFA NL Premier Division South Conference 0-10-0 (R)

2016 BAFA NL Premier Division North Conference 3-7-0

2015 BAFA NL Premier Division North Conference 8-2-0*

2014 BAFA NL Premier Division North Conference 6-3-0*

2013 BAFA NL Premier Division North Conference 5-5-0

2012 BAFA NL Division One North 7-3-0*

2011 BAFA NL Division Two 9-1-0*

2010 BAFL Division Two North Conference 6-4-0

2009 BAFL Division Two North Conference 5-4-1

2008 BAFL Division Two North Conference 6-4-0

2007 BAFL Division Two North Conference 4-6-0

2004 BSL Division One Northern Conference 3-7-0**

2003 BSL Division One Northern Conference 5-2-1*

2002 BSL Division One Northern Conference 3-7-0

2001 BSL Division Two Northern Conference 7-0-1*

2000 BSL Division Two Northern Conference 2-5-1

1999 BSL Division One Northern Conference 0-10-0

1998 BSL Division Two North Eastern Conference 9-1-0*

1997 BSL Division One Northern Conference 0-10-0

1996 BSL Division Two Northern Conference 1-9-0

1995 BAFA Division Two North/Midlands Conference 9-1-0*

1994 BAFA Division Two North/Midlands Conference 5-2-1*

1993 BNGL Premier Division Midlands Conference 9-1-0*

1992 BNGL Premier Division Northern Conference 8-2-0*

1991 BNGL Premier Division North Western Conference 4-6-0

1990 BNGL First Division North Western Conference 8-1-1*

1989 BNGL First Division Northern B Conference 4-5-1

(¹Clinched playoff spot.
²Includes games awarded after midseason pulling out from league.)

References

External links
 Team website

BAFA National League teams
Sport in Blackburn
2004 establishments in England
American football teams established in 2004
American football teams in England